{|{{Infobox aircraft begin
 |name =Caesar's Chariot
 |image = Boeing 720, Private JP5894674.jpg
 |caption = Caesar's Chariot showing Led Zeppelin's Swan Song Records logo on the tailfin}}

|}Caesar's Chariot was a former United Airlines Boeing 720 passenger jet which was chartered by English rock band Led Zeppelin for their 1977 concert tour of North America.

History
The airplane, N7224U (S/N: 18077), was rolled out from the assembly line on December 12, 1961, and its first flight was on January 16, 1962. It was delivered to United Airlines on April 10. In 1975, the airplane was purchased by Desert Palace Inc. and then by Todd Leasing in March 1975, when it was named Caesars Chariot.Caesar's Chariot was hired by Led Zeppelin in 1977 from Caesars Palace Hotel and Casino in Paradise, Nevada. The band required the plane because the plane they had previously used for their 1973 and 1975 North American concert tours, The Starship, was permanently grounded at Long Beach Airport with engine difficulties, and they required a comparable alternative.Caesar's Chariot had been converted from a regular Boeing 720 into a 45-seat plane. For the 1977 tour, the fuselage of the plane was painted with the 'Led Zeppelin' and 'Swan Song' logos. It was also fitted with huge, overstuffed-chair type seating, and there was a bar and private rooms for each member and a Hammond organ.Steven Rosen, "Led Zeppelin's 1977 Tour - A Tragic Ending!", Classic Rock Legends. The fees charged for leasing the plane amounted to $2500 per day.

As they had done on their previous 1973 and 1975 concert tours with The Starship, Led Zeppelin based themselves at major cities such as Chicago and used Caesar's Chariot'' to shuttle them to and from concerts. Tour manager Richard Cole explained:

After Led Zeppelin returned the plane in late 1977, it returned to Caesar's Palace service until the United States Air Force bought it in late 1986 and sent it to Davis-Monthan AFB in early 1987 for use in the KC-135 re-engine and spares support program. It was totally disassembled for parts by the end of 1987, but parts may have been obtained by an aircraft maintenance school.

The aircraft was used by the Bee Gees in their Spirits Having Flown Tour of 1979. It was hired for a cost of over one million dollars, and was custom painted in a black and red scheme with gold and silver accents.

See also
 The Starship

References

Led Zeppelin
Individual aircraft
1962 establishments in the United Kingdom
Caesars Palace